E-sign or esign may refer to:

 Electronic signature
 Electronic Signatures in Global and National Commerce Act, a United States federal law
 ESign (India), an electronic signature service
 Estimated sign (℮), in the European Union

See also
 E-Mark (disambiguation)